Delta Peak  is a very sharp peak marking a pronounced corner point on Ackerman Ridge, 6 nautical miles (11 km) northeast of Mount Gjertsen, in the La Gorce Mountains. It was mapped by the United States Geological Survey from surveys and U.S. Navy air photos, 1960–64, and was so named by the New Zealand Geological Survey Antarctic Expedition, 1969–70, because as seen from the south the colorful rock strata present a well visible form that is suggestive of the Greek letter Delta.

References

Mountains of Marie Byrd Land